Amphidromus comes is a species of air-breathing land snail, a terrestrial pulmonate gastropod mollusc in the family Camaenidae.

Habitat 
This species lives in trees.

Distribution 
The type locality of this species is Đồng Nai Province, Vietnam.

References 

comes
Fauna of Vietnam
Gastropods described in 1861